Singhbhum  was a district of India during the British Raj, part of the Chota Nagpur Division of the Bengal Presidency. It was located in the present-day Indian state of Jharkhand. Chaibasa was the district headquarters. Located in the southern limit of the Chota Nagpur Plateau, Singhbhum included the Kolhan estate located in its southeastern part. The district has been divided into three smaller districts, being East Singhbhum, West Singhbhum and Saraikela Kharsawan all are present in Jharkhand state of India. This district of Jharkhand is one of the leading producer of copper in India.

Etymology
Singhbhum gets its name from the 16th century military general Man Singh 1 who is known for his conquests Of Bihar, Odisha and parts of Bengal. He later also served as the governor (Subahdar) of this region during the reign of King Akbar.

Geography
It is bounded with Ranchi District in the north, with the Saraikela and Kharsawan princely states in the east, with Mayurbhanj and Keonjhar in the south as well as with Bonai and Gangpur in the southwest.

History
The Singhbhum area was never invaded by either the Marathas or the Mughals. The first relationships between the Raja of Singhbhum and the British were established in 1767 when he approached the Resident at Midnapore requesting protection. In 1820 the Raja became a feudatory of the British. The state was under the political control of the Commissioner of the Bengal Presidency until 1912,  under the Bihar and Orissa Province until 1936 and then under Chhota Nagpur Division until the end of the British Raj.

Following the independence of India Singhbhum District became part of the Indian Union as a district of Bihar. The district has in recent decades been divided into three smaller districts, being East Singhbhum, West Singhbhum and Saraikela Kharsawan. All the three are currently part of Jharkhand state of India. The major Indian languages spoken in this region are Hindi, Bengali, Odia, Kurmali and many tribal languages.

References

Former districts of Bihar
Bengal Presidency